Isaac Habrecht is the name of:

 Isaac Habrecht I (1544-1622), horologist
 Isaac Habrecht II (1589-1633), doctor of medicine and philosophy / professor of astronomy and mathematics